Series 90 may refer to:

Aircraft
 Express Series 90, an American homebuilt aircraft design

Computing
 UNIVAC Series 90, mainframe computers
 Series 90 (software platform), a platform for mobile phones that uses Symbian OS
 UNIVAC Series 90, line of mainframe computers

Trains
 JNR 90 series, prototype of JNR 101 series electric multiple unit